In TRIZ, inventive standards are a set of rules of synthesis and transformation of technical systems directly resulting from laws of evolution of these systems. As a rule, solving of a complex inventive problem is addressed to a combination of at least  one TRIZ method and physical effect. Based on frequently used combinations of TRIZ methods and physical effects Genrich Altshuller proposed inventive standards.

Current Definition (TRIZ Glossary) 
According to TRIZ Dictionary, inventive standard is a problem-solving method which proposes a rule presenting how to transform a Su-Field given to achieve the result required. The description of the rule consists of two parts: its left part presents an existing Su-Field  that has to be improved (a generic model of a problem) and its right part presents a Su-Field that implements such an improvement (a generic model of a solution).

Ontology Diagram 
The following picture presents the ontology diagram of Inventive standard concept.

Related TRIZ terms (on the diagram) 
Standard Inventive Problem

Substance-Field Model

TRIZ method (?)

Physical Effect

References 

Problem solving